Isak Malcolm Kwaku Hien (born 13 January 1999) is a Swedish professional footballer who plays as a defender for Italian  club Hellas Verona and the Sweden national team.

Club career

Early career 
Hien played youth football for AIK, where he played alongside future professional players Alexander Isak and Leopold Wahlstedt. In 2016, he signed with Vasalunds IF with which he made his senior debut in Division 1 Norra in 2017. Up until the age of 21, he operated mainly as a striker, but was convinced to switch to centre-back, and flourished in that new position. In 2021, he signed with Djurgårdens IF before going back to Vasalund on loan during the 2021 Superettan season. During the 2022 season, Hien played in 17 games and scored two goals in Allsvenskan before he was signed by Serie A side Hellas Verona.

Hellas Verona 
On 27 August 2022, Hien signed a four-year contract with Hellas Verona in Italy for a sum of €3,5 million which can raise up to €5 million.

International career 
On 14 September 2022, Hien was selected for the Sweden national team for the first time ahead of their 2022–23 UEFA Nations League B games against Serbia and Slovenia. On 24 September 2022, he made his full international debut in a 1–4 loss against Serbia, playing the full 90 minutes at centre back alongside national team captain Victor Lindelöf.

Personal life 
Hien's mother is Swedish, while his father was born in Ghana to parents from Burkina Faso.

Career statistics

Club

International

References

External links 
 Djurgården profile 

1999 births
Living people
Footballers from Stockholm
Swedish people of Ghanaian descent
Swedish people of Burkinabé descent
Swedish footballers
Sweden international footballers
Association football forwards
Association football defenders
Vasalunds IF players
Djurgårdens IF Fotboll players
Ettan Fotboll players
Hellas Verona F.C. players
Allsvenskan players
Superettan players
Serie A players
Swedish expatriate footballers
Expatriate footballers in Italy
Swedish expatriate sportspeople in Italy